The Black Crow Limestone is an Early Eocene (Late Ypresian to Early Lutetian) geologic formation in the Sperrgebiet, ǁKaras Region of southwestern Namibia. The limestones of the approximately  thin formation were deposited in a lacustrine to paludal environment. The formation provides many fossil mammals and amphibians, reptiles, fresh water snails and fish.

Description 
The type locality of Black Crow lies a few km north-east of Bogenfels Ghost Town, in the central part of the Tsau//Khaeb National Park (old name – Sperrgebiet) in Namibia. The top of the formation is formed by an erosional unconformity at the base of the Late Oligocene to Early Miocene Blaubok Conglomerate. The fauna from the Black Crow Limestone, especially the arsinoithere Namatherium blackcrowense and the reithroparamyid rodent Namaparamys inexpectatus indicate a Late Ypresian or Early Lutetian age for the deposits. The limestones are likely to be older than 42.5 Ma on the basis of radio-isotopic dates obtained from phonolite cobbles reworked from lavas considered to have erupted later than the limestone deposition. The carbonates could be as old as 47 ± 1 Ma, i.e. Late Ypresian to Early Lutetian.

Abundant pedotubules in the formation suggest accumulation in a swampy setting.

Fossil content 
Various fossils have been recovered from the formation. The fossil land snails from the Black Crow Limestone, even though they are not very diverse, show biogeographic affinities with present-day southwestern Africa (Western Cape in South Africa and Western Namibia) and they suggest that at the time of deposition, the region lay within a zone of summer rainfall rather than winter rainfall. The paleoclimate has been interpreted as hot and humid, contrasting with the arid desert of today.

The following fossils are reported from the formation:

Mammals

 Diamantochloris inconcessus - lower molars, maxillary fragments with premolars and molars
 Glibia namibiensis Namahyrax corvus - skull, mandible, isolated teethPickford, 2018e, p.83
 Namalestes gheerbranti - isolated teeth and maxilla
 Namaparamys inexpectatus - isolated molar, premolar, calcaneum
 Namatherium blackcrowense - skull
 Notnamaia bogenfelsi - maxilla
 Tsaukhaebmys calcareus - isolated teeth, mandible, post-cranial bones
 Zegdoumys namibiensis - upper molar
 Pterodon sp. - mandible
 cf. Propottininae indet.
 Proviverrinae - deciduous tooth
 Adapidae - mandible, isolated teeth
 Erinaceidae indet. - isolated tooth
 Macroscelididae indet.
 ?Xenarthra - phalanx
 zalambdodont - tiny mandible

Amphibians
 Pipidae - radio-ulna

Reptiles
 Amphisbaenia - vertebrae, mandibles, premaxilla, maxilla
 Crocodylia - maxilla fragment, teeth and vertebra
 Ophidae - fang, vertebrae
 Scincidae - mandibles and post-cranial elements

Birds - indeterminate post-cranial elements

Fish
 cf. Alestes sp. - isolated tricuspid tooth
 Hydrocynus sp. - isolated tooth
 Cichlidae - button-shaped teeth

Snails
 Dorcasia sp. - many shells
 Trigonephrus sp.''
 cf. Subulinidae indet. - poorly preserved shells

See also 

 List of fossiliferous stratigraphic units in Namibia
 Geology of Namibia
 Elisabeth Bay Formation
 Langental Formation

References

Bibliography 

 
 
 
 
 
 
 
 
 

Geologic formations of Namibia
Eocene Series of Africa
Lutetian Stage
Ypresian Stage
Limestone formations
Lacustrine deposits
Paludal deposits
Paleontology in Namibia
Geography of ǁKaras Region